Greenwood Cemetery is a registered historic district in Hamilton, Ohio, listed in the National Register of Historic Places on July 22, 1994.  It contains 5 contributing buildings. Greenwood is designed in the style of a landscaped park and garden with mortuary art and statues among the graves.

History

In 1848 the Greenwood Cemetery Association was created in order to establish a community cemetery. Land to create the cemetery was purchased from local resident David Bigham, and planned by Adolph Strauch. Greenwood Cemetery was modeled after Mount Auburn Cemetery in Boston and Spring Grove Cemetery in Cincinnati which had also been designed by Strauch.

Prominent burials
 Raymond H. Burke, US Congressman, teacher, and businessman
 Lewis D. Campbell, US Congressman – over his political career he was elected as a Whig, Republican, Know Nothing, and Democrat, as well as colonel of the 69th Ohio Infantry during the Civil War
 Ray Combs, host of Family Feud
 Warren Gard, US Congressman, attorney, prosecutor, and jurist
 Samuel Herrick, US Congressman
 John M. Millikin, Republican politician and Ohio State Treasurer
 Henry Lee Morey, US Congressman and US Army Civil War officer
 James E. Neal, US Congressman and Speaker of the Ohio House of Representatives
 Robert M. Sohngen, lawyer and justice of the Supreme Court of Ohio 1947–1948
 Larry Troutman, Zapp lead singer
 Roger Troutman, founder of Zapp
 Elijah Vance, politician and Speaker of the Ohio Senate in 1835 and 1836.
 Ferdinand Van Derveer, Civil War Brigadier General
 S. S. Warner, Republican politician and Ohio State Treasurer from 1866–1871.
 John Woods, US Congressman

Notes

External links
 
 
 

Cemeteries on the National Register of Historic Places in Ohio
Protected areas of Butler County, Ohio
National Register of Historic Places in Butler County, Ohio
Buildings and structures in Hamilton, Ohio
Historic districts in Butler County, Ohio
1848 establishments in Ohio
Cemeteries established in the 1840s